"Unshaken" is a song by American singer-songwriter D'Angelo. It was produced by Daniel Lanois, who wrote the track with D'Angelo and Rocco DeLuca. The song was written for the original soundtrack to the 2018 video game Red Dead Redemption 2. It was released as a digital single through RCA Records on January 4, 2019, and later as part of the game's soundtrack released by Lakeshore Records and Rockstar Games. It was D'Angelo's first piece of new music released since his third studio album, Black Messiah, released in December 2014.

D'Angelo was invited to perform a song for Red Dead Redemption 2 after showing enthusiasm during playtesting, having been a big fan of its predecessor. DeLuca conceived the chant in the song's chorus, based on a proverb by Paramahansa Yogananda. Lanois felt that the lyrics were appropriate to the game's narrative. The song is moderately slow and includes D'Angelo's lower vocal register. "Unshaken" received positive reviews, both in the context of the game and as an individual track, and reached number 6 on the Billboard R&B Digital Song Sales chart.

Background 
Prior to the release of "Unshaken", the last piece of music that D'Angelo put out was his third studio album, Black Messiah, in December 2014, which acted as his first studio album in 14 years. Some time after the release of that album, D'Angelo discovered that Rockstar Games was developing Red Dead Redemption 2; as he was a big fan of its predecessor, Red Dead Redemption (2010), D'Angelo reached out to Ivan Pavlovich, the director of music and audio at Rockstar, to play the game. Pavlovich recalled that D'Angelo would visit Rockstar's New York City office at midnight and play the game for several hours, adding that the singer found the game to be "incredible".

Due to his enthusiasm, Rockstar's music team invited D'Angelo to perform on a song for the game's soundtrack. Pavlovich felt that D'Angelo's involvement in the game led to producer Daniel Lanois's engagement with the project.  Lanois took an early version of the song to D'Angelo in New York. They added a percussion track, with Brian Blade on drums, Cyril Neville on cowbell, Lanois playing guitar, and D'Angelo playing Rhodes piano, and turned it into a full song. The recording process took around a week and a half. Lanois and D'Angelo originally began working on a rock-oriented song in a  time signature, but "it didn't pan out".

Composition and lyrical interpretation 

"Unshaken" is a moderately slow track, performed in the key of G minor with a tempo of 80 beats per minute. Chaz Kangas of KZGO called it a neo soul song, while Jon Caramanica of The New York Times described it as "lonely cowboy-western soul". Musically, Elias Leight of Rolling Stone called the song "meditative", featuring soft keyboards, low-key percussion, and a groove inspired by New Orleans rhythm and blues. D'Angelo sings in his lower vocal register on the track, a deliberate choice by Pavlovich to differentiate it from his typical falsetto singing voice. Ryan Reed of Rolling Stone described the performance as "crooning bleak imagery over a percussive groove". Lanois's co-writer Rocco DeLuca conceived the chant for "Unshaken" in New Orleans, based on a proverb by Paramahansa Yogananda: "You must stand unshaken amidst the crash of breaking worlds". Lanois felt that the term applied to the determination of game's characters throughout the story. The chant was also used in the song "Crash of Worlds" on the game's soundtrack (2019).

Ilana Kalish of Atwood Magazine described the song's opening percussion as a "secret knock on a hidden door", leading into the "privately uttered password" of the opening lines, which repeats Yogananda's proverb. Amanda Hurych of AXS noted that the song's chorus is a plea for strength in difficult situations. Dom Nero of Esquire described the proverb as "something between a battle cry and an elegy", writing that it encapsulates the game's narrative direction. Atwood Magazines Kalish felt that the verses unlock the thoughts of Red Dead Redemption 2 protagonist Arthur Morgan as he attempts to decipher his path. She identified a connection between D'Angelo's lyrical approach on "Unshaken" and his previous music, avoiding being "preachy" while being universal. Jason Guisao of Game Informer found that the song recounts the game's important themes: "redemption through violence, redemption through heroism, and, most importantly, redemption through fatherhood".

Release 

"Unshaken" was originally only available for listening via gameplay in Red Dead Redemption 2 when it was released in October 2018. It is played in the background while Arthur rides on a horse back to his camp at a pivotal moment in the game's story. Bootleg versions of the audio were eventually uploaded to YouTube for listening outside of the gameplay. The song's official release came on January 4, 2019, when it was uploaded onto digital platforms through RCA Records. The song was later published by Lakeshore Records and Rockstar Games as part of The Music of Red Dead Redemption 2 (Original Soundtrack), released digitally on July 12, 2019, and as a CD and vinyl record on September 20, 2019.

Reception 
Atwood Magazines Kalish praised the combination of musical elements in "Unshaken", particularly the lyrics and percussion. Hurych of AXS described the song as "a perfect complement" to Red Dead Redemption 2s narrative. Esquires Nero called the track "transporting", hailing its performance in the game as "a sublime narrative moment that's among the best gaming has ever offered". Dave Thier of Forbes wrote that the song's percussion track was in rhythm with the gallop of Arthur's horse in the game. Game Informers Guisao identified that "Unshaken" was the game's most popular song. It peaked at number six on the US R&B Digital Song Sales.

Personnel 
Credits adapted from the liner notes of The Music of Red Dead Redemption 2 (Original Soundtrack).
 D'Angelo vocals, Rhodes piano, writer, lyrics
 Brian Blade drums
 Rocco DeLuca writer, lyrics
 Daryl Johnson percussion
 Daniel Lanois guitar, writer, lyrics, producer, mixing engineer
 Cyril Neville percussion

Charts

References 

2018 songs
2019 singles
D'Angelo songs
Paramahansa Yogananda
RCA Records singles
Red Dead Redemption 2
Song recordings produced by Daniel Lanois
Songs written by D'Angelo
Songs written by Daniel Lanois
Songs written for video games